Gymnommopsis is a genus of parasitic flies in the family Tachinidae. There are at least four described species in Gymnommopsis.

Species
These four species belong to the genus Gymnommopsis:
 Gymnommopsis cordubensis (Blanchard, 1943)
 Gymnommopsis gagatea Townsend
 Gymnommopsis gagtea Townsend, 1927
 Gymnommopsis misionensis (Blanchard, 1943)

References

Further reading

 
 
 
 

Tachinidae
Articles created by Qbugbot
Tachinidae genera